The Grant Parish School Board is an entity responsible for the operation of public schools in Grant Parish, Louisiana, United States. It is headquartered in the town of Colfax. The parish is named for Ulysses S. Grant (1822-1885),  General-in-Chief of the United States Army / Union Army during the American Civil War (1861-1865) and later 18th President of the United States, served 1869–1877.

Schools

PK-12 Schools
Georgetown High School (Georgetown)

Secondary schools
Grades 7-12
Montgomery High School (Montgomery)
Grades 9-12
Grant High School (Unincorporated area)
Grant Academy (Unincorporated area)
Grades 7-8
Grant Junior High School (Dry Prong)

 Primary schools (Grades PK-6)
Colfax Elementary School (Colfax)
Pollock Elementary School (Pollock)
South Grant Elementary School (Unincorporated area)
Verda Elementary School (Unincorporated area)

Demographics
Total Students (as of October 1, 2007): 3,422
Gender
Male: 53%
Female: 47%
Race/Ethnicity
White: 85.13%
African American: 13.35%
Hispanic: 0.67%
Native American: 0.44%
Asian: 0.41%
Socio-Economic Indicators
At-Risk: 61.37%
Free Lunch: 49.85%
Reduced Lunch: 11.51%

See also
List of school districts in Louisiana

References

External links
Official website

School districts in Louisiana
Education in Grant Parish, Louisiana